Aslon Oliveira (born 10 January 1994) is an Indian professional footballer who plays as a striker for Salgaocar F.C. in the I-League.

Career

Salgaocar
Oliveira made his professional debut on 28 April 2014 against Churchill Brothers at the Tilak Maidan Stadium in which he came on as a substitute for Rosario Mendes in the 70th minute as Salgaocar lost the match 1–2.

Career statistics

References

External links 

1994 births
Living people

Indian footballers
Salgaocar FC players
Association football forwards

I-League players
Place of birth missing (living people)
Footballers from Goa